Rajiv Kumar (born 19 February 1960) is a 1984-batch Indian Administrative Service officer. On 15 May 2022, he assumed the charge as the 25th Chief Election Commissioner of India, succeeding Sushil Chandra.

Early life
Rajiv Kumar Born on February 19, 1960, he holds degrees in BSc, LLB, PGDM, and a master's degree in public policy. Rajiv completed his LLB from Delhi University between 1979 and 1982 and he is also an alumnus of the TERI School of Advanced Studies.

Career
Rajiv Kumar is an Indian Administrative Service officer of the Bihar/Jharkhand cadre of the 1984 batch. As the director and joint secretary in the Tribal Affairs Ministry between 2001 and 2007, Kumar drafted the Scheduled Tribes (Reorganisation of Forests Rights) Bill, 2005. It was under his supervision that the Special Central Assistance to States and Grants under Art. 275(1) of the Constitution was granted for the development of scheduled and tribal areas.

Rajiv Kumar has also held other positions such as director for the Central Board of Reserve Bank of India (RBI), SBI, and NABARD. He has also been a member of the Economic Intelligence Council (EIC), Financial Stability and Development Council (FSDC), Bank Board Bureau (BBB) and Financial Sector Regulatory Appointments Search Committee (FSRASC). He held the post of finance secretary between September 2017 and February 2020. During his tenure, he undertook several banking, insurance, and pension reforms. Kumar has been instrumental in streamlining the National Pension System (NPS) which extends its benefits to about 18 lakh central government employees. He superannuated from service in February 2020 and later he held the post of chairman of the Public Enterprises Selection Board since April 2020 before being appointed as the Election Commissioner of India on September 1, 2020.

As Finance Secretary-cum-Secretary, Department of Financial Services to GOI, (Sept 2017 - Feb 2020), Kumar supervised the financial services sector and was instrumental in introducing inter-alia major initiatives/reforms in Banking, Insurance & Pension sector. Kumar was also instrumental in conceiving and implementing mega-mergers of Banks & acquisitions in the financial sector. He planned and implemented an unprecedented recapitalization program for PSBs amounting to Rs. 2.11 lakh crore to support capital adequacy of PSBs and prevent default. He is credited with the turnaround of the Banking Sector and establishing in a short span that lenders and borrowers have to stick to prudential norms of lending. To curb the circulation of black money in a layered fashion, Kumar had frozen bank accounts of ~3.38 lakh shell companies used for creating fictitious equity. Streamlining of National Pension System (NPS) was also affected, benefitting approximately 18 lakh Central Government employees including enhancement of mandatory contribution by the Central Government.

25th Chief Election Commissioner
Rajiv Kumar was appointed as the Chief Election Commissioner of India (CEC) on May 15, 2022. His term will end in February 2025. Kumar successfully conducted 16th Presidential and Vice Presidential Elections elections in 2022. Droupadi Murmu and Jagdeep Dhankar were respectively elected as the President and the Vice-President of India.

After assuming charge, Kumar trekked for 18  km through inaccessible terrain to visit an interior polling station in Dumak village in Chamoli, Uttarakhand. He assessed the polling requirements and motivated polling officials, who travel through tough terrains during elections. Soon after taking charge as CEC, ECI initiated action against over 2100 Registered Unrecognized Political Parties (RUPPs) for enforcing due compliances as per RP Act and ECI guidelines.

References

Members of the Election Commission of India
Living people
Indian Administrative Service officers
1960 births
Chief Election Commissioners of India